John Keith (born April 24, 1986) is a former professional Canadian football linebacker. He was signed by the Toronto Argonauts as a street free agent in 2009. He played college football for the Arkansas-Pine Bluff Golden Lions, and now works at Antelope Valley High School as a truancy counselor.

External links
Toronto Argonauts bio

1986 births
Living people
Sportspeople from Los Angeles County, California
American players of Canadian football
Canadian football linebackers
Arkansas–Pine Bluff Golden Lions football players
Toronto Argonauts players